Douglas da Silva Santos (born 25 August 1999), known as Douglas Silva, Douglas Pelé or just Douglas, is a Brazilian footballer who plays as a right back for Goiás, on loan from Boa Esporte.

Club career
Born in Arcoverde, Pernambuco, Douglas began his career with hometown side Flamengo de Arcoverde. After a stint at Tuna Luso, he moved to Sete de Setembro in 2019, initially for the under-20 squad.

After making his senior debut with Sete in 2020, Douglas joined Boa Esporte on 25 May 2021. On 27 September, he was announced at Uberaba on loan, and helped the side to win the Campeonato Mineiro Segunda Divisão.

After returning to Boa on 22 December 2021, Douglas was loaned to Iporá the following 19 January. On 4 April 2022, he moved to Série A side Goiás on loan until the end of the year.

Douglas made his top tier debut on 23 October 2022, starting in a 2–1 away win over Cuiabá.

Career statistics

Honours
Uberaba
Campeonato Mineiro Segunda Divisão: 2021

References

External links
Futebol de Goyaz profile 

1999 births
Living people
Sportspeople from Pernambuco
Brazilian footballers
Association football defenders
Campeonato Brasileiro Série A players
Campeonato Brasileiro Série D players
Boa Esporte Clube players
Uberaba Sport Club players
Iporá Esporte Clube players
Goiás Esporte Clube players